Nygård is a locality situated in Lilla Edet Municipality, Västra Götaland County, Sweden. It had 419 inhabitants in 2010.

References 

Populated places in Västra Götaland County
Populated places in Lilla Edet Municipality